Williamites may refer to either of two minor Roman Catholic religious orders or congregations:
Benedictine Williamites of Monte Vergine
Hermits of Saint William

Or may refer to:
the "Williamite" followers of King William III of England